Paola Merrill (born 5 December 1997) is an American YouTuber from the Southern United States. She has over a million subscribers on her YouTube channel, TheCottageFairy.

Early life and education

Paola grew up in Puerto Rico for a time before moving to the southern United States. She also lived in Cuba for a few years, as well as Ireland and Italy. Paola's father is a former Navy Captain from Washington. Carmen Merrill, her mother, is a native Puerto Rican who moved from Puerto Rico to New York at the age of 22 and later joined the Navy Reserve. Paola has two siblings: Rohan Merrill, her younger brother, and Liana, her older sister. Rohan is also a YouTuber with a channel called Letters From Ro, and Liana is a martial artist.

In Dublin, Ireland, she took an English language course at University College Dublin.
Paola then relocated to the United States to pursue a literature degree at Western Washington University in Bellingham, Washington.

Career

Paola launched her YouTube channel, TheCottageFairy, on March 21, 2020.
She created her channel to highlight the beautiful natural landscape of her area while also assisting in its preservation. Paola began working with her iPhone and eventually became a popular YouTuber.
She has 1.3 million subscribers on her YouTube channel as of March 2023.

References

1997 births
Living people